The 1869 Newton by-election was a by-election held on 19 March 1869 during the 4th New Zealand Parliament in the Auckland electorate of .

The by-election was caused by the resignation of the incumbent MP George Graham.

He was replaced by Robert James Creighton. Some electors were opposed to the centralising of government in Wellington which they suggested Wrigg favoured.

Results

Notes

Newton 1869
1869 elections in New Zealand
Politics of the Auckland Region